Burkhard Cordes (born 15 May 1939 in Darmstadt, Germany) is a Brazilian sailor.  He won a bronze medal in the Flying Dutchman Class with Reinaldo Conrad at the 1968 Summer Olympics.

References

 Profile at sports-reference.com

External links
 
 
 
 

1939 births
Living people
Sportspeople from Darmstadt
Brazilian male sailors (sport)
Brazilian people of German descent
Sailors at the 1968 Summer Olympics – Flying Dutchman
Sailors at the 1972 Summer Olympics – Flying Dutchman
Olympic sailors of Brazil
Olympic bronze medalists for Brazil
Olympic medalists in sailing
Medalists at the 1968 Summer Olympics